The 2000–01 Auburn Tigers men's basketball team represented Auburn University in the 2000–01 college basketball season. The team's head coach was Cliff Ellis, who was in his seventh season at Auburn. The team played their home games at Beard–Eaves–Memorial Coliseum in Auburn, Alabama. They finished the season 18–14, 7–9 in SEC play.

Roster

References

Auburn Tigers men's basketball seasons
Auburn
Auburn
Auburn
Auburn